Domitia aenea is a species of beetle in the family Cerambycidae. It was described by Parry in 1849, originally under the genus Lamia.

References

Lamiini
Beetles described in 1849